This article features a list with world association football records including professionals, semi-professionals, amateurs, juniors or women's football, in any football league, cup, or other competition around the world. These records are divided based on whether they relate to players, coaches, clubs, or world competitions.

Players 
Players in bold are still active.

Goals and goalscoring records

Appearances records

Other records

Coaches 
Coaches in bold are still active.

Clubs

World Competitions

FIFA World Cup 
Players and coaches in bold are still active at club level, though not necessarily internationally.

Olympic Games 
Players in bold are still active.

FIFA Club World Cup

Other world records

See also

Fastest goals in association football
List of footballers with the most official appearances
List of footballers with 500 or more goals
List of players with the most goals in an association football game
List of most expensive association football transfers
Lists of hat-tricks
List of footballers who achieved hat-trick records 
Progression of association football caps record
European association football club records and statistics
List of longest managerial reigns in association football
List of world champion football club winning managers

References

Association football records and statistics